A by-election was held for the Australian House of Representatives seat of Hughes on 18 February 1984. This was triggered by the resignation of Labor Party MP Les Johnson to become Australian High Commissioner to New Zealand. The by-election was held to coincide with the Corangamite and Richmond by-elections.

The election was won by Labor candidate Robert Tickner, despite a 5.3% swing to the Liberal Party.

Candidates

Australian Democrats – Ronald Hellyer.
Independent – Leslie Johnson.
Liberal Party of Australia – Clifford Mason.
Australian National Action Group – Jim Saleam, a far-right activist who had previously been involved with the Australian Nazi Party.
Australian Labor Party – Robert Tickner, a Sydney City Councillor.

Results

See also
 List of Australian federal by-elections

References

1984 elections in Australia
New South Wales federal by-elections
February 1984 events in Australia